The 4th Division was a unit of the Reichswehr.

Creation 
In the Order of 31 July 1920 for the Reduction of the Army (to comply with the upper limits on the size of the military contained in the Treaty of Versailles), it was determined that in every Wehrkreis (military district) a division would be established by 1 October 1920. The 4th Division was formed in January 1921 out of the Reichswehr-Brigaden 12, 16 and 19, all part of the former Übergangsheer (Transition Army). 

It consisted of 3 infantry regiments: the 10th and 11th (Saxonian) Infantry Regiments, and the 12th Infantry Regiment. It also included an artillery regiment, an engineering battalion, a signals battalion, a transportation battalion and a medical battalion. It was subordinated to Gruppenkommando 1.

The commander of the Wehrkreis IV was simultaneously the commander of the 4th Division. 
For the leadership of the troops, an Infanterieführer and an Artillerieführer were appointed, both subordinated to the commander of the Division.   

Commanders of the 4th Division were:

General of the Infantry Paulus von Stolzmann 1 October 1920 - 16 June 1921
Generalleutnant Alfred Müller 16 June 1921 - 29 October 1925
General of the Infantry Richard von Pawelsz 29 October 1925 - 1 June 1926
General of the Infantry Erich Wöllwarth 1 June 1926 - 1 January 1929
General of the Infantry Edwin von Stülpnagel 1 January 1929 - 1 November 1931
Generalleutnant Curt Freiherr von Gienanth 1 November 1931 - 30 September 1933

Notable Infantrieführer : 
 Generalleutnant Paul Hausser (1 November 1930 - 31 January 1932).

Notable Artillerieführer : 
 Generalmajor Ludwig Beck (1 February 1932 - 30 September 1932)

The unit ceased to exist as such after October 1934, and its subordinate units were transferred to the 21 divisions newly created in that year.

Garrisons 
The divisional headquarters was in Dresden.

References

 Feldgrau.com

Infantry divisions of Germany
Military units and formations established in 1920
Military units and formations disestablished in 1934